Osayomore Joseph (29 October 1952 – 11 June 2022) was a Nigerian musician who was one of the early pioneers of African popular Highlife music, known for his anti-corruption and government critical lyrics.

Career 
Osayomore Joseph was born in Ugha village near Benin City, Nigeria, on 29 October 1952. He started his music career in the Nigerian Army Band during the 1970s.

Death 
Osayomore Joseph died at University of Benin Teaching Hospital in Nigeria as a result of stroke.

Discography

References

External links 
 Osayomore and the creative 7 at Allmusic.com
 Osayomore Joseph Discography

1952 births
2022 deaths
20th-century Nigerian musicians
Musicians from Edo State